The mayor of Southland is the head of the municipal government of Southland District, New Zealand. The mayor is directly elected using the first-past-the-post electoral system. The current mayor is Rob Scott, who was elected in 2022.

History
Southland District was established as part of the 1989 local government amalgamation. Frana Cardno joined the Southland District as a councillor in 1989, before being elected mayor in 1992. She retired from that role in October 2013 prior to that year's local elections, and was New Zealand's longest-serving female mayor ever.

List of office holders
Southland District has had four mayors:

References

Southland
Southland
Mayors of places in Southland, New Zealand